Zu ol Faqari may refer to:
 Zu ol Faqari, Kohgiluyeh and Boyer-Ahmad
 Zu ol Faqari, Sistan and Baluchestan